This page is an overview of the results of Finland at the World Single Distance Championships.

List of medalists

Medal table

Medals by discipline

Medals by championships

Speed skating in Finland